Germanic culture is a term referring to the culture of Germanic peoples, and can be used to refer to a range of time periods and nationalities, but is most commonly used in either a historical or contemporary context to denote groups that derive from the Proto-Germanic language, which is generally thought to have emerged as a distinct language after 500 BC.  Germanic culture is characterized as having significant roots from Scandinavian and Teutonic cultures, and has notable influences from other societies at the time, namely the Roman Empire, who gave the tribe its Latin name, Germani. Over time the various different local and regional dialects of the language have diverged and each has adopted several distinct geographical and national properties, with an estimated 37 Germanic languages and 550 million speakers worldwide.

Origins
There is much debate over the exact period that Germanic culture became a distinct cultural group within Europe.  With the first recorded annotations written by Tacitus, the Roman historian most agree that the culture’s roots were present from about 1–400 AD onward.  The ancestors of the medieval Germanic peoples are believed to be genealogical descendants of the Nordic Bronze Age, an event that saw mass emigration from the colder regions of the north into the fertile lands of central Europe. For this reason, Germanic mythology and that of the Norse pantheon having a striking resemblance resulting in several identical myths and legends.

Language
The first emergence of a linguistically distinct Germanic language is thought to be around 500 B.C., however since the only written records of the time are from Tacitus, it is difficult to establish a clear progression of the language’s trajectory. While there is no written evidence to suggest that most tribes were able to converse with each other, it is likely that they were multilingual as almost every one of the dialects has its roots within the mother (PIE) language.  Until around the 5th Century AD, most dialects were diverse enough in their structure, syntax and content that any attempts at reconciling the two could not be done. By then, Germanic languages had picked up extensive amounts of Latin from their exposure to the Roman empire. This signalled the transition to the varied modern Germanic languages prevalent today, with features such as its differing characters, (the umlaut) its declarative sentence structure (subject, verb, other) and its emphasis on "strong" and "weak" verbs, that make it functionally different from many other languages that are comparable around Europe.

Religion and folklore
Paganism has always been the driving religious system practised within Germanic tribes.  However, each tribe or group would belong to a different sect, one formed through interaction with other societies and religions, and loosely based on a Nordic/European tradition. One of the largest influences upon Germanic religion has been its encounters with other cultural groups such as the Celts and Romans, who also inhabited central Europe. There is archaeological evidence to suggest that these religions / customs traded iconography and myth freely amongst themselves. The afterlife within their religion was similar to the Norse, as an emphasis on dying a glorious death in battle was seen as a sacrifice given to the gods to please them.
For example, deities worshipped by Germanic cultures (such as Odin, or Thor) share direct lineage with the Norse gods of the same name. While worship of these gods has waxed and waned over the years, there is proof that they did stem from a northern European origin.

Germanic religion also had many crossovers with that of the Romans. Notably their shared ritual practices, particularly the culture’s fascination with nature and their position within the world: primarily with a patriarchal worldview concerning men’s position within the religion: having men as the executors of rituals, akin to a family priest or shaman. These rituals did not occur in any ceremonial buildings, instead taking place within the home, a place of much spiritual importance to Germanic culture. While spiritual duties were traditionally carried out by men, there are historical examples of Germanic priestesses in Roman writings, women who would take the role of a religious leader and would usually be involved in the performance of executions. Their folklore has always been one that has directly reflected their physical environments: Gnomes, who lived underground: Woodland Elves who inhabited the forests, and basilisks, living in the seas. Elements of these traditions have endured into the modern day, and are still told as contemporary fairy tales. The transition to Christianity only began when contact with Rome reached a zenith in the 11th century and Scandinavian paganism was successfully replaced by the Christian church. Religion in modern Germanic culture is directly split between Catholicism and the EKD, a German evangelical church.

List of historical cultures
Early Germanic culture
Migration period art
Animal style
Anglo-Saxon culture
Elbe Germanic culture

See also
Germanic folklore

References

Sources
 Waldman, Carl; Mason, Catherine (2006). Encyclopedia of European Peoples. New York: Facts on File. pp. 20–24

 
European culture
Indo-European culture